Esri Canada is the Canadian provider of enterprise geographic information system (GIS) solutions from Esri. GIS allows multiple layers of information to be displayed on a single map. Esri Canada’s solutions are based on ArcGIS technology. The company also distributes vertical-focused solutions. from technology partners such as Schneider Electric. A third of its offerings are professional services.

In 2010, the company was first named into the Branham300, a listing of key players in the Canadian information technology industry by revenue, compiled annually by analyst firm Branham Group.  Esri Canada ranked #67 in the Top 250 Canadian IT Companies list and was named one of the Top 25 IT Professional Services Providers in Canada. The company is a Platinum Winner among Canada's Best Managed Companies and has also been named one of Canada's Most Admired Corporate Cultures in the mid-market category.

History and expansion 

Esri Canada was founded in 1984 by Alex Miller and Mary-Charlotte Miller, the company’s president and vice president of corporate policy respectively. The company is headquartered in Toronto, Ontario. Esri Canada’s GIS solutions have been traditionally used for land-use planning and natural resource management.  Early users of Esri technology in Canada include forestry giant J.D. Irving, Limited  and Oxford County, Ontario

Esri Canada helped design the County of Oxford’s pioneering GIS model in 1985, called the Land Related Information System (LRIS), which integrated information such as property and infrastructure data from various government systems. The LRIS received the prestigious Exemplary Systems in Government Award from the Urban and Regional Information Systems Association (URISA) in 1988. 
The system continues to be used by the County today and has been expanded to support numerous business processes including administering building permits, civic addressing and emergency preparedness planning.

Advancements in GIS technology fuelled the growth of Esri Canada. The use of GIS for digital mapping or electronic cartography, geographic analysis and data management expanded into other industries including business, government, education, defence, public safety, public works, transportation, telecommunications, utilities and health care.

GIS applications across industries

Use of GIS by government, business, and industry has increased. The information it provides is used in a variety of areas, including tracking the spread of diseases, managing utility outages, and focusing marketing.

In addition, many organizations are turning to GIS technology as they strive to become more productive.  Rona (company), Canada’s largest home renovation products retailer, uses Esri technology to plan flyer distribution.  They incorporate data from loyalty programs with other socio-economic data to obtain a picture of customer spending around each store. The same data now helps the retailer in locating new stores.

Utilities are also looking at GIS to help them reduce costs, increase productivity and achieve greater accuracy in recording and retrieving field asset data. Utilities Kingston, which provides water, wastewater, gas, electrical and networking services in Kingston, Ontario, eliminated paper trail in its operations, such as surveys and field visits for repairs and maintenance, by using mobile GIS applications.

St. Michael’s Hospital (Toronto)  used Esri technology integrated with other systems to create  [BIO.DIASPORA] which predicts the global spread of infectious diseases by analyzing commercial air travel.
The system was used to accurately predict the spread of the H1N1 virus around the world in early 2009,  and also analyzed potential health threats during the 2010 Vancouver Olympics. BIO.DIASPORA was named a Laureate winner in the 2011 Computerworld Honors program, which recognizes outstanding use of information technology to benefit society.

With the strong demand for GIS solutions, the company’s workforce has grown to 300 employees by 2010, serving more than 10,000 customers.

Community maps program

To foster innovation and enhance the development of GIS applications, Esri Canada launched its Community Maps Program in June 2010.  It intends to facilitate sharing of geographic data between governments and the public and provides free access to online community base maps that governments, businesses, and the public can use to develop GIS applications. Natural Resources Canada and Agriculture and Agri-Food Canada contributed national base maps, while the City of Toronto government was the first municipality to contribute its geographic data through the program.

Local governments can augment their initiatives promoting Open Data in Canada by contributing their geographic data and community maps through the program, to be integrated into a World Topographic Map in Esri's ArcGIS Online portal.  Other Canadian municipalities that have joined the program include St. Albert, Alberta; Nanaimo, British Columbia; Kamloops, British Columbia;  Surrey, British Columbia;  District of Oak Bay, British Columbia; Township of Langley, British Columbia; Moncton, New Brunswick;  Fredericton, New Brunswick; and St. John’s, Newfoundland and Labrador, among others.

Environmental stewardship

Inspired by the Ryerson University  study "The Environmental Benefits and Costs of Green Roof Technology" that  showed widespread greening of commercial building rooftops in Toronto could reduce the urban heat island effect, Esri Canada completed the installation of a 704-square metre green roof in its Toronto headquarters in 2009.

The rooftop garden has provided numerous environmental and business benefits such as reduced storm water runoff, heating and cooling costs; additional habitat for urban wildlife; and additional meeting space. The green roof has won several awards such as the Green Toronto Awards, Design Exchange  Awards (honourable mention) and was named one of North America’s Green Roofs for Healthy Cities .
It received the most number of public votes at Greenroofs.com’s inaugural Love the Earth, Plant a Roof! Earth Day photo contest in 2010.
The company also received a certificate of merit for service to the environment from the Ontario Association of Landscape Architects.

In 2010, Esri Canada was named into the Diamond Legacy League of Ducks Unlimited  Canada for contributing more than $1,000,000 in technology and services in support of wetland conservation.  WWF-Canada also presented the company with an award in 2006 for its support of the organization in protecting Canada’s biodiversity.

References

External links
Esri Canada Corporate Web Site
Esri Canada Community Maps Program
Esri Canada's Garden in the Sky Video

Technology companies of Canada